Stade Léon-Bollée was a multi-purpose stadium in Le Mans, France. It is used mostly for football matches and was the home stadium of Le Mans UC72 until 2011, when it was replaced by MMArena. The stadium is able to hold 17,801 people and was built in 1906. 

Leon-Bollee
Leon-Bollee
Multi-purpose stadiums in France
Sports venues in Sarthe
Sports venues completed in 1906
1906 establishments in France